Jai West (ジェイ・ウエスト born October 24, 1976) is an actor and poet of French Canadian and Japanese descent born in Vancouver, British Columbia and currently based in Tokyo, Japan.

He is best known for his work on screen as manic Japanese American gangster Lee in Sion Sono's Hazard (2005), a thief grappling with his sexual identity in Gen Sekiguchi's Survive Style 5+ (2004), and portraying Beethoven in the popular Tokyo Gas commercials. He has appeared in numerous films and television series, from 21 Jump Street (1990) to Takashi Shimizu's The Great Horror Family (2004) and Takashi Miike's Big Bang Love, Juvenile A (2006). West has released two spoken word poetry albums in Japanese and English under the pseudonym Lotus Chamelion.

In 2018, he became the chairman of Iron Chef Canada.

Career
In 2016, West starred alongside Pamela Anderson and Dree Hemingway in the Canadian-Japanese drama The People Garden.  He played a mysterious driver and worker.

In 2018, West was announced as the Iron Chef Canada chairman, which premiered on October 17 on Food Network.

In 2021, West portrayed the arch-villain Lyon Arkland in the Kamen Rider film Zero-one Others: Kamen Rider MetsubouJinrai. The movie's release coincided with the 50th anniversary of the historic tokusatsu superhero franchise. Lyon Arkland is the CEO of ZAIA Enterprise, a global weapons manufacturing company and transforms into Kamen Rider Zaia.

Filmography

References

External links

Jai West's JMDb entry (in Japanese)
 E Film Critic "Survive Style 5+" review
DVD Active "Survive Style 5+" review
 All About interview (in Japanese)

Living people
Japanese male film actors
Canadian male film actors
Canadian male television actors
Canadian male actors of Japanese descent
Canadian expatriates in Japan
Male actors from Vancouver
1976 births